Hormud-e Mehr Khui (also Romanized as Hormūd-e Mehr Khū’ī; also known as Harmood, Hormoz, Hormūd, Hormūd-e Mehr Khūyeh, Ḩormūd-e Mīr Khū, Hormūd-e Mīr Khūnd, Hormūd-e Mīr Khūneh, and Hormuz) is a village in Howmeh Rural District, in the Central District of Larestan County, Fars Province, Iran. At the 2006 census, its population was 1,567, in 335 families.

References 

Populated places in Larestan County